Vasad Junction railway station (station code: VDA) is a railway station on the Western Railway network in the state of Gujarat, India. Vasad Junction railway station is 15 km far away from Anand railway station. Passenger, MEMU and few Express trains halt at Vasad Junction railway station.

Nearby stations 

Nandesari is nearest railway station towards Vadodara, whereas Adas Road is nearest railway station towards Ahmedabad.

Trains 

The following Express trains halt at Vasad Junction railway station in both directions:

 19033/34 Gujarat Queen
 19215/16 Saurashtra Express
 19035/36 Vadodara–Ahmedabad Intercity Express

See also
 Anand district

References

Railway stations in Anand district
Vadodara railway division
Railway junction stations in Gujarat